Terry Robin George Stringer  (born 3 September 1946) is a sculptor from New Zealand.

Biography
Born in Redruth, Cornwall, England in 1946, Stringer became a naturalised New Zealander in 1979. He received a Diploma of Fine Arts from the Elam School of Fine Arts in 1967. Many New Zealand galleries and collections feature works by Stringer and he has completed a number of public commissions. Stringer has been the recipient of a number of New Zealand art awards and scholarships and has been awarded the Queen Elizabeth II Arts Council Scholarship three times.

In the 2003 New Year Honours, Stringer was appointed an Officer of the New Zealand Order of Merit, for services to sculpture.

Major public commissions
Stringer has been commissioned to complete a number of sculptures for high-profile public sites.  These include "The Risen Christ" (1999) in Cathedral Square in Christchurch, "Mountain Fountain" outside The Holy Trinity Cathedral, Auckland, and "The World Grasped" (2006) in Newmarket.

Zealandia Sculpture Garden
In 2001 Stringer established Zealandia Sculpture Garden at his home in Mahurangi.  The garden is open to the public and contains a variety of Stringer's sculptures, together with works by fellow sculptors.

References

External links
Te Papa collections profile
Interview with Terry Stringer as conducted by Doctor Mark Stocker for the Cultural Icons project. Audio and video.

1946 births
Living people
People from Redruth
English emigrants to New Zealand
Elam Art School alumni
Officers of the New Zealand Order of Merit
20th-century New Zealand sculptors
20th-century New Zealand male artists
21st-century New Zealand sculptors
21st-century New Zealand male artists